The following lists events that happened during 1975 in the United Arab Emirates.

Incumbents
President: Zayed bin Sultan Al Nahyan 
Prime Minister: Maktoum bin Rashid Al Maktoum

Events

March
 March 12 - The Dubai Islamic Bank was established in the United Arab Emirates, becoming the first private institution to operate under the principles of Islamic banking. With the charging of interest on a loan prohibited by Islamic law, the banks instead make an investment in the item upon which the loan is planned, without a fixed interest rate. Similar Islamic banks were established in 1977 in Kuwait, Egypt and the Sudan.

References

 
Years of the 20th century in the United Arab Emirates
United Arab Emirates
United Arab Emirates
1970s in the United Arab Emirates